Spain competed at the 2022 Mediterranean Games in Oran, Algeria from 25 June to 6 July 2022.

Medal table

Archery

Men

Women

Mixed

Artistic gymnastics

Spain competed in artistic gymnastics.

Athletics

Men
Track & road events

Field events

Men
Track & road events

Field events

Badminton

Spain competed in badminton.

Basketball

Spain won the bronze medal in the men's tournament and the gold medal in the women's tournament.

Boules

Spain competed in boules.

Lyonnaise

Pétanque

Boxing

Spain competed in boxing.

Men

Women

Cycling

Spain competed in cycling.
Men

Women

Fencing

Spain competed in fencing.

Men

Women

Football

Summary

Group play

Handball

Summary

Men's tournament
Group play

Semifinal

Gold medal game

Women's tournament
Group play

Semifinal

Gold medal game

Judo

Spain competed in judo.

Men

Women

Karate

Men

Women

Sailing

Spain competed in sailing.

Shooting

Spain competed in shooting.

Swimming

Table Tennis

Spain competed in table tennis.

Taekwondo

Spain competed in Taekwondo.

Tennis

Spain competed in tennis.

Men

Women

Volleyball

Spain competed in volleyball.

Water polo

Summary

Group play

Semifinal

Bronze medal game

Weightlifting

Spain competed in weightlifting.

Men

Women

Wrestling

Men's Freestyle

Men's Greco-Roman

Women's Freestyle

References

Nations at the 2022 Mediterranean Games
2022
Mediterranean Games